Edward J. Locke (1869–1945) was an American playwright born in England.

He became a theatre and vaudeville actor while still in his teens. He wrote some vaudeville sketches and plays, the most successful of which was The Climax, which has been filmed twice (the first time in 1930, the second in 1944), though one version bore little resemblance to the play. The Case of Becky was also the subject of a movie. The Revolt (1915) was made into the  World Pictures' The Revolt the following year.

Works
Fighting Fate (1905)
The Climax (1909)
The Case of Becky (1912)
The Silver Wedding (1913)
The Revolt (1915)
The Bubble (1915)
The Dancer (1919)
The Woman Who Laughed (1922)
Mike Angelo (1923)
The Love Call (1927)
57 Bowery (1928)

References

External links
 
 
 
 The Bubble by Edward Locke and Benedict James on Great War Theatre

1869 births
1945 deaths
American dramatists and playwrights
English emigrants to the United States